An Undie Run is an event where a large number of people disrobe until they are only wearing underwear, and then run.  The site of Undie Runs are typically college campuses, but they may occur on other sites such as streets.  Undie Runs may be purely for entertainment, a form of protest, or as with the ASU Undie Run, fund-raising for charitable purposes.  It is reported that the Guinness Book of World Records considers the Undie Run that took place on September 24, 2011, in Salt Lake City, Utah, United States to have had a record number of participants.  There were 2,270 participants in that Undie Run, which was held to protest Utah's conservative laws.
COED Magazine, a magazine in the United States marketed to college students, has reported that Undie Runs are the "number one university sanctioned event".

History

One of the earliest known Undie Runs was started by student Eric Whitehead at UCLA in the fall of 2001.

Universities in North America with Undie Run traditions
Arizona
 Arizona State University (ended 4/28/15)
 University of Arizona
Boston
 Boston College
 Northeastern University
 British Columbia
 University of British Columbia
 California
 California State University, Chico
 California State University, Fullerton
 University of California, Irvine
 California State University, Long Beach
 University of California, Los Angeles
 Chapman University, Orange, California
 University of California, San Diego
 San Diego State University
 University of California, Santa Barbara
 University of Southern California
Colorado
 Colorado State University
 Florida
 University of Florida
Kansas
 University of Kansas
Kentucky
 University of Kentucky
Montana
 University of Montana – Missoula
Nevada
 University of Nevada, Las Vegas
 University of Nevada, Reno
New Mexico
 University of New Mexico
New York
 New York University
Oregon
 Oregon State University
Texas
 University of Texas, Austin
Washington
 University of Washington
Wisconsin
 University of Wisconsin

See also
Naked Pumpkin Run
No Pants Subway Ride
Underwear as outerwear

References

External links

 utahundierun.com
 cupidsundierun.com
 asuundierun.com

Student culture in the United States
Slang
Undergarments
2000s fads and trends
Articles containing video clips
Novelty running
Activities in underwear